Talang 2007 was the first season of the show Talang, the Swedish version of Got Talent. Talang 2007 had its premiere on 13 April 2007 and ended on 1 June 2007. The winner of the show was Zillah & Totte. This season was hosted by Peppe Eng, and the judges were: Tobbe Blom, Hanna Hedlund and Bert Karlsson.

Popularity
The show became an instant success and was consistently one of the top three television shows in Sweden each week.

</ref> and shown during and after each performance.  Public voting started when the program aired on Friday and ended at midnight Sunday. Unlike the American TV series, where the public voted for free by calling a toll free number, the Swedish audience paid 5.70 Swedish kronor (June 2007, approximately US$0.82) for each call they made.

After the second semi-final aired, TV4 surprised the contestants by announcing that two wild card finalists would be chosen from the eliminated semi-finalists. One wild card finalist was chosen by the jury whilst the other was chosen by public vote. With only two days to prepare for the final competition, the wild card finalists had little chance of winning.

For the final program (episode 8), the winner was chosen only by public vote. Despite that, the jury still voted and commented on each performance.  Voting started when the program started at 8 pm and concluded at some undisclosed time during the 1.5 hr long program.  The voting procedure potentially gave an unfair advantage to contestants who performed early in the show.  Indeed, the winner of Talang 2007 performed first.  Furthermore, all of the phone numbers for each contestant were published before the show, allowing the public to vote for their favorite contestant before they had given their final performance.

Auditions Summary

 Judge Disapproved |  Judge Approved
 |

Semi-finalists By Jury

Non Semi-Finalist By Jury

Eliminated By Jury

Semi-finals Summary

During the three semi-finals (episodes 5–7), two finalists were chosen from each program, one by the jury and another by public vote.  The public voted for a contestant by phoning a specific telephone number, which was published before the show aired.

 Judge Disapproved |  Judge Approved
 |  |

Semi-final 1

Semi-final 2

Semi-final 3

Final

 Judge Disapproved |  Judge Approved
 |

Winner

Zillah & Totte

Totte is Zillah's three-year-old (stuffed animal) chimpanzee.  The duo talk, sing, and perform magic tricks together for their comical performances. For the winning performance, Zillah & Totte sang Herreys "Diggi-loo diggi-ley" on a stage with large letters that spelled TOTTE.  In the middle of the song, Zillah fell backwards over the letters and Totte blamed her for destroying their chance to win.  "Now you owe me a million!" said Totte to Zillah before first demanding the audience to vote for him and then sweetly asking for their vote.  The strategy worked as they not only won the jury's votes but also votes of the public.

Contestants
Many of the contestants in Talang 2007 are professional entertainers, have family ties in the entertainment business, had previously won talent competitions, or were completing an education specializing in their art form. Participating on the show gave them free publicity for their business and/or art form.  A couple of contestants were requested by TV4 or a jury member to participate in the show.

 Julien Dauphin is a professional magician who won the 2006 Swedish Championships in Magic and the 2004 Nordic Championships in Magic, and placed 6th in the 2006 World Championships in Magic. Prior to Talang 2007, he performed one time with jury member Blom. He was requested by TV4 to participate in Talang 2007 and first turned down the request before finally agreeing to compete. Julien Dauphin made it to the finals and was one of the jury's favorite contestants.
 The Harlem Hot Shots is a professional dance troupe that specializes in African American dances such as Lindy Hop, Tap dance and Blues dance.  The members are internationally recognized dance instructors and performers.  They organize and/or teach at the annual Herräng Dance Camp, the world's largest dance camp of its genre.  For Talang 2007, their talent was Lindy Hop and they primarily performed Lindy Hop routines at high tempos with many acrobatics.  For their final performance however, they started with a short segment of blues dancing and were criticized by jury member Blom for social dancing on stage.  The Harlem Hot Shots participated in Talang 2007 to interest the public in the Lindy Hop dance.
 While the parents of Mimmi Sandén are not singers, Mimmi has two older sisters who are: Molly Sandén and Frida Sandén.  The sisters have competed in several talent competitions including Stjärnskott 2006 (Molly placed 1st) and Stage Junior 2006 (Molly placed 1st, Frida and Mimmi qualified).  They are often backing singers for each other.  For example, Molly and Frida were backing singers for Mimmi during her final performance for Talang 2007.  Also Frida and Mimmi were backing singers for Molly during her final performance for Stage Junior 2006. The three sisters met jury member Karlsson during Stage Junior 2006.
 The father of Skånske Elias (Elias Andersson), Richard Andersson, is a musician and songwriter that has created several neo-classical metal bands.  In 2006, Skånske Elias competed and won the Ung Talang 2006 talent competition and placed 2nd in Stjärnskott 2006. Skånske Elias made it to the finals of Talang 2007 and was one of Karlsson's and the audience's favorite contestants.
 Diamond Dogs is a professional drag show team that was created in 2002 by Peter Englund and Reine Tapper.  Many popular Swedish artists, such as Linda Bengtzing, Shirley Clamp and Sonja Aldén, have recorded parodies of themselves for the team.  Diamond Dogs was surprised to be selected as a wild card finalist but managed to create a new performance, a parody of Talang 2007, for the final show.  While jury members Blom and Hedlund thought that Diamond Dogs should not win the competition and gave them red Xs, they found their performance to be very entertaining and also gave them green checks.
 The female country music band Landslide had disbanded after graduating from gymnasium, but were requested to participate in Talang 2007 by jury member Karlsson.  Karlsson had paid for a large colored advertisement in the evening newspaper Expressen to search for them, which they didn't see.  Three days before the program recording date, Karlsson called one of the band members and asked them to participate in the show. After some discussion, they agreed to do so and spent the next few days practicing together.  They received green check marks from Karlsson during both their audition and semi-final performances.
During Talang 2007, Melissa Jacobsson-Velandia was a student in the music program at Södra Latin, an elite gymnasium in Stockholm for Sweden's best artists and musicians.  She won several scholarships and contests for piano playing, e.g., she won the 2006 SPPF (Swedish Piano Instructor Association) Inspiration Scholarship, the 2007 Steinway Student VIP Prize, and the 2007 Steinway Piano Festival. For Talang 2007, she played difficult classical music pieces that the general public was not familiar with, such as "Gnomenreigen" by Franz Liszt (episode 3).  Unfortunately this worked against her.  Jury member Karlsson felt that her talent did not belong in the program, partly because it was not a profitable enough talent, and she did not receive enough votes to continue to the finals.

Controversy and criticism
To make the show appeal to a wide audience, the producers attempted to change the jury's decision during the filming of episode 3. TV4 wanted a mix of males and females to continue from the auditions whereas Karlsson felt that quality should determine whether a contestant continued or not.

During the semi-finals, the jury intentionally only selected adult competitors to continue to the finals since they thought the public would only vote for children and the final program would become a children's show. Debates in the TV4 Talang 2007 forum about the public's tendency to vote for child acts and whether adults and children should compete in the same show were ongoing throughout the entire season. The host, Peppe Eng, had to rush the jury through their comments for each contestant to keep the show on schedule.  Furthermore, TV4 sabotaged the show's climax by showing the name of the winner to the TV audience before the winner was announced; when the card containing the winner's name was removed from the envelope, the winner's name faced the camera.

Footnotes

References

  
 
  
 
 
 
 
 
 
 
  
 
 
  

Talang (Swedish TV series)
2007 Swedish television seasons